The Moody Performance Hall (formerly Dallas City Performance Hall) is a performing arts venue located in the Arts District of Downtown Dallas, Texas, USA. Designed by Skidmore, Owings & Merrill LLP (SOM) in collaboration with the Architect of Record, Corgan Associates, Inc., and constructed by the City of Dallas, the performance hall will be built in two phases. Phase I, which consists of the 750-seat proscenium theater and its support spaces, was completed in 2012. The project will be LEED Platinum. Funding for the performance hall was provided by the Citizens of Dallas through the 2006 Bond Program.

The project team included:

Design Architect: Skidmore, Owings & Merrill

Architect of Record: Corgan Associates, Inc.

Theater Consultants: Schuler Shook

Acoustics: Jaffe Holden

Cost Estimators: Donnell Consultants, Inc.

Construction Manager: McCarthy

References

External links
Moody Performance Hall
City of Dallas Office of Cultural Affairs
Project Page on SOM.com
Architype Review

Concert halls in Texas
Downtown Dallas
Music venues in Dallas
Skidmore, Owings & Merrill buildings
Theatre in Dallas